Gunning Bedford Jr. (1747 – March 30, 1812) was an American Founding Father, delegate to the Congress of the Confederation (Continental Congress), Attorney General of Delaware, a delegate to the Constitutional Convention in 1787 which drafted the United States Constitution, a signer of the United States Constitution, and a United States district judge of the United States District Court for the District of Delaware.

Education and career

Bedford was born in 1747, in Philadelphia, Province of Pennsylvania, British America, the fifth of eleven children to a wealthy family.  He graduated from the College of New Jersey (now Princeton University) on September 25, 1771, with honors, as a classmate of James Madison. He was admitted to the Delaware bar and entered private practice in Dover from 1779 to 1783. 

On July 17, 1775, the Second Continental Congress resolved to elect Bedford to deputy-muster-general for New York in the Continental Army, during the American Revolutionary War. On February 28, 1776, he was assigned to the northern army in Canada to muster troops there monthly. On June 18, 1776, he was promoted to muster-master-general and assigned to New York.  He served briefly as an aide to General George Washington.

He was a delegate to the Congress of the Confederation from 1783 to 1785. He was Attorney General of Delaware from April 26, 1784, to September 26, 1789. He was appointed a commissioner to the Annapolis Convention in September 1786 but did not attend. He was a delegate to the Constitutional Convention in 1787, which drafted the United States Constitution and was a signer of the Constitution. During the convention, Bedford's threat, "the small ones would find some foreign ally of more honor and good faith, who will take them by the hand and do them justice" was shouted down as treasonous by the other delegates. 

He was a member of the Delaware convention which ratified the Constitution in 1787. He was a member of the Delaware Legislative Council (now the Delaware Senate) in 1788. He was confirmed by the United States Senate on September 26, 1789, and received his commission the same day. Bedford was a leading advocate for the abolition of slavery.

Family

Bedford was a cousin of Gunning Bedford Sr., a Governor of Delaware. In late 1772 or early 1773, Bedford married Jane Ballareau Parker, the daughter of James Parker, a printer who had learned his trade from Benjamin Franklin. He had 5 children, none of whom married. In 1793, he purchased Lombardy Hall on 250 acres in Brandywine Hundred.

Death and legacy

He died in office as a federal judge on March 30, 1812. He was interred first in the Presbyterian Cemetery in Wilmington. His remains were moved to the Masonic Home Cemetery at Christiana, Delaware. The cemetery is now the location of the Wilmington Institute Library.

Notes

References

 
 Delaware Members of Congress
 The Political Graveyard
 Judges of the United States Courts
 National Historic Landmarks Program 
 Lombardy Hall

External links

 Delaware Historical Society; website
 University of Delaware; Library website

1747 births
1812 deaths
Founding Fathers of the United States
Burials at Wilmington and Brandywine Cemetery
People from Wilmington, Delaware
Princeton University alumni
Delaware lawyers
Delaware Attorneys General
Continental Congressmen from Delaware
18th-century American politicians
Delaware state senators
Members of the Delaware House of Representatives
United States federal judges appointed by George Washington
18th-century American judges
Judges of the United States District Court for the District of Delaware
Signers of the United States Constitution
People of colonial Delaware
Politicians from Philadelphia